Kreców  (Kretsiv) is a village in the administrative district of Gmina Tyrawa Wołoska, within Sanok County, Podkarpackie Voivodeship, in south-eastern Poland.

The village has a population of 10.

References

Villages in Sanok County